The Bonn International is an international badminton tournament held in Germany. The event is part of the Badminton World Federation's Future Series and part of the Badminton Europe Elite Circuit. It was held for the first time in 2019.

Host cities

 2019, 2022: Bonn

Past winners

Performances by nation

References

External links

Badminton tournaments in Germany
Recurring sporting events established in 2019
2019 establishments in Germany